Kakaji Kahin is an Indian political satire that aired  on Doordarshan in 1988. It was one of Basu Chatterjee's acclaimed works for Indian television, based on a book called Netaji Kahin by well-known author Manohar Shyam Joshi.

Actor Om Puri played the titular role of Kakaji with a supporting cast of Shail Chaturvedi and others.

Cast 
 Om Puri as Kakaji
 Shail Chaturvedi as Netaji

References

External links 
 

1980s Indian television series
1988 Indian television series debuts
DD National original programming
Indian comedy television series
Political satirical television series
Indian political television series